The Best of Bob Dylan is a compilation album released in the United Kingdom, New Zealand, Australia and Canada on 2 June 1997. It was later released in Europe and Japan, although it has never been released in the United States.

Track listing

Certifications

References

External links
 

1997 greatest hits albums
Albums produced by Barry Beckett
Albums produced by Bob Dylan
Albums produced by Bob Johnston
Albums produced by Daniel Lanois
Albums produced by Don DeVito
Albums produced by John Hammond (producer)
Albums produced by Jerry Wexler
Albums produced by Leon Russell
Albums produced by Mark Knopfler
Albums produced by Tom Wilson (record producer)
Bob Dylan compilation albums
Columbia Records compilation albums